Gloucestershire County Cricket Club are an English cricket club based in Bristol. The club has played first-class cricket since 1870 against Surrey. The club have played both List A cricket and Twenty20 cricket since their introductions into the English game in 1963 and 2003 respectively.

The county were captained for their first 29 years of first-class cricket by W. G. Grace, whose family had helped form the club. The 359 first-class matches which he captained are the most by any player, eclipsing the combined 327 matches of Mark Alleyne, who led the county in all three formats of the game. Alleyne captained the county during its most prosperous spell, during which time they won eight one-day trophies. Gloucestershire have never won the official County Championship, but have runners-up on a number of occasions. They achieved this twice under the captaincy of Bev Lyon, whose captaincy was the primary factor in him being named as one of the Wisden Cricketers of the Year in 1931. Wisden noted that he was "a possible England captain," though he never went on to appear for England.

The majority of Gloucestershire's captains have been English, only Mike Procter and Courtney Walsh have played international cricket for a different nation. Walter Troup, Cyril Sewell and George Emmett were all born outside of the United Kingdom, but within the British Empire. Three members of the Graveney family captained the county: Tom Graveney from 1959 to 1960, his brother Ken Graveney from 1963 to 1964, and the latter's son David Graveney between 1982 and 1988.

Key
 Years denotes the years in which the player was named as official club captain for Gloucestershire.
 First denotes the date of the first match in which the player captained Gloucestershire.
 Last denotes the date of the last match in which the player captained Gloucestershire.
 FC denotes the number of first-class matches in which the player captained Gloucestershire.
 LA denotes the number of List A matches in which the player captained Gloucestershire.
 T20 denotes the number of Twenty20 matches in which the player captained Gloucestershire.
 Total denotes the total number of first-class, List A and Twenty20 matches in which the player captained Gloucestershire.

Official captains

References

 
 

Cricket
Gloucestershire